Peter Duncan (born 1 January 1945) is an Australian Labor Party politician and one of the relatively few members of parliament to have served not only in both a state and national parliament but also as a minister in both cases.

Peter Duncan was born in Melbourne and went to the University of Adelaide, where he studied law and was co-editor of the student newspaper On Dit in 1968. He was elected to the South Australian House of Assembly from the electorate of Elizabeth in the 1973 South Australian election, when he was 28.

In state parliament Duncan served as 41st Attorney-General of South Australia from 1975 until 1979, and then as Minister for Health until the defeat of the Corcoran Labor government at the 1979 election. He resigned from state politics in 1984, sparking an Elizabeth by-election, to contest the seat of Makin in the 1984 Australian election, which he held at every election until defeated when Labor lost office federally in 1996.

Duncan was Minister for Land Transport and Infrastructure Support for the last half of 1987 and Minister for Employment and Education Services for over three years from 1988 to 1990. After leaving the ministry in 1990, he became Parliamentary Secretary to the Attorney-General in December 1991, a post he held until Labor lost office.

Duncan had a business career after politics, which became a source of controversy when he was charged in September 2007 with 'making an untrue statement in application for a Commonwealth grant and with dishonestly causing loss to a Commonwealth entity'. It was reported that this had occurred in the wake of the failure of his plastic recycling business Omnipol. He was subsequently ordered to stand trial on three counts in the South Australian District Court. Duncan went on trial on 3 November 2008, pleading not guilty. On 11 November, he was acquitted on all charges.

Notes

1945 births
Living people
Australian Labor Party members of the Parliament of Australia
Members of the Australian House of Representatives for Makin
Members of the Australian House of Representatives
Members of the South Australian House of Assembly
Australian Labor Party members of the Parliament of South Australia
University of Adelaide alumni
Attorneys-General of South Australia
20th-century Australian politicians
Government ministers of Australia